Hubert Schoonbroodt (8 August 1941 in Eupen – 5 February 1992 in Jalhay) was a Belgian musician.

1941 births
1992 deaths
20th-century Belgian musicians
Belgian classical organists
Male classical organists
People from Eupen
Academic staff of the Royal Conservatory of Brussels
Academic staff of the Royal Conservatory of Liège
20th-century classical musicians
20th-century organists
20th-century Belgian male musicians